Proposition 7 of 1911 (or Senate Constitutional Amendment No. 22) was an amendment of the Constitution of California that introduced, for the first time, the initiative and the optional referendum. Prior to 1911 the only form of direct democracy in California was the compulsory referendum.

Since the first state constitution was enacted in 1849, it has been obligatory for constitutional amendments and certain other measures to be approved by voters in a referendum in order to become law. Proposition 7 introduced a form of optional (or facultative) referendum on ordinary statutes. This means that a proposed law passed by the state legislature must be put before the electorate if a specific number of voters sign a petition requesting a referendum. The amendment also introduced the more powerful initiative procedure. This means that a certain number of voters can propose an entirely new statute or constitutional amendment, which then must be put to a vote of the people.

Proposition 7 was part of the Progressive Era of reforms. On the same day voters approved Proposition 4, which granted women the vote, and Proposition 8, which introduced another instrument of direct democracy, the recall of elected representatives.

Provisions

Proposition 7 was approved by the California Legislature on 20 February 1911. It was ratified by voters in a referendum held as part of a special election on 10 October. The amendment altered the state constitution by rewriting and adding a long set of provisions to Article 4, Section 1, which dealt with the legislature. As amended, the section began,

It continued, "the first power reserved to the people shall be known as the initiative" and "the second power reserved to the people shall be known as the referendum". The provisions on direct democracy have since been moved, and reworded somewhat. Today they are contained in Article 2.

See also
California ballot proposition (the initiative and referendum in California)

References

External links
Documents on the State-wide Initiative, Referendum & Recall (Includes full text of SCA No. 22)
The Initiative Process

1911 California ballot propositions
1911
Electoral system ballot measures in the United States